This list shows the regiments the Portuguese Army had during the Napoleonic Wars.

Infantry Regiments

Cavalry Regiments

Artillery Regiments

Caçador Battalions

Sources
 
 
 
 
 
 
 
 
 
 
 
 
 
 
 
 
 
 
 
 
 
 
 
 
 
 
 
 
 
 
 
 
 
 
 
 
 
 
 
 
 
 
 
 
 
 
 
 
 
 
 
 

Portuguese Army
Military units and formations of the Napoleonic Wars